Wolofsky is a Yiddish surname. 

People with this name include:
 Hirsch Wolofsky (1878–1949), Canadian Jewish author
 Saul Jerome Wolofsky (1916–2008), Canadian leader of the Communist Party of Quebec
 Zella Wolofsky (born 1947), Canadian modern dancer and HCI researcher

Jewish surnames